Barbronia is a genus of annelids belonging to the family Salifidae.

The species of this genus are found in Europe and Northern America.

Species:

Barbronia assiuti 
Barbronia delicata 
Barbronia gwalagwalensis 
Barbronia weberi

References

Annelids